The 73rd Annual Tony Awards were held on June 9, 2019, to recognize achievement in Broadway productions during the 2018–19 season. The ceremony was held at Radio City Music Hall in New York City and was broadcast live by CBS. James Corden served as host.

Hadestown was the most awarded show of the season, with eight including Best Musical. The Ferryman won four awards, including Best Play. Musicals The Cher Show and Tootsie, the revival of Rodgers and Hammerstein's Oklahoma!, and the new play Ink each won two awards.

The ceremony received mixed reviews, with many criticizing the performance of Corden as host. At the 72nd Primetime Emmy Awards, it was nominated for three awards: Outstanding Variety Special (Live), Outstanding Directing for a Variety Special, and Outstanding Lighting Design / Lighting Direction for a Variety Special.

Eligibility
The official eligibility cut-off date for Broadway productions opening in the 2018–2019 season was April 25, 2019. 34 shows were eligible.

Original plays
 American Son
 Bernhardt/Hamlet
 Choir Boy
 The Ferryman
 Gary: A Sequel to Titus Andronicus
 Hillary and Clinton
 Ink
 The Lifespan of a Fact
 The Nap
 Network
 The New One
 Straight White Men
 To Kill a Mockingbird
 What the Constitution Means to Me

Original musicals
 Ain't Too Proud
 Beetlejuice
 Be More Chill
 The Cher Show
 Gettin' the Band Back Together
 Hadestown
 Head Over Heels
 King Kong
 Pretty Woman: The Musical
 The Prom
 Tootsie

Play revivals
 All My Sons
 The Boys in the Band
 Burn This
 King Lear
 Torch Song
 True West
 The Waverly Gallery

Musical revivals
 Kiss Me, Kate
 Oklahoma!

Events

Nominations 
The Tony Award nominations were announced on April 30, 2019 by Bebe Neuwirth and Brandon Victor Dixon and broadcast on CBS.

Hadestown received 14 nominations, the most of any production of the season. Ain't Too Proud followed, with 12 nominations. The plays The Ferryman and To Kill a Mockingbird each received nine nominations.

Other events 
The annual Meet the Nominees Press Reception took place on May 1, 2019 at the Sofitel New York Hotel. The annual Nominees Luncheon took place on May 21, 2019 at the Rainbow Room. A cocktail party was held on June 3, 2019 at the Sofitel New York Hotel to celebrate the season's Tony Honors for Excellence in the Theatre and Special Award recipients.

Creative Arts Awards
The Creative Arts Tony Awards ceremony was presented prior to the televised award ceremony. The ceremony was hosted by Danny Burstein, Karen Olivo and Aaron Tveit. The awards presented include honorary awards and technical categories.

Ceremony

Presenters
The ceremony's presenters included:

 Tina Fey and Jake Gyllenhaal – presented Best Featured Actress in a Play
 Samira Wiley and Abigail Breslin – presented Best Featured Actor in a Play
 Samuel L. Jackson and LaTanya Richardson Jackson – presented Best Actress in a Play
 Jane Krakowski – introduced Tootsie
 Darren Criss and Sienna Miller – presented Best Featured Actor in a Musical
 Shirley Jones and Aasif Mandvi – introduced Oklahoma!
 Danai Gurira and Christopher Jackson – presented Best Direction of a Musical
 Catherine O'Hara – introduced Beetlejuice
 Lucy Liu – special presentation on the Tonys' history
 Laura Benanti and Anthony Ramos – presented Best Featured Actress in a Musical
 Kristin Chenoweth – introduced The Prom
 Michael Shannon and Marisa Tomei – presented Best Revival of a Play
 BeBe Winans – introduced Choir Boy
 Rachel Brosnahan and Jesse Tyler Ferguson – presented Best Direction of a Play
 Billy Porter – presented Excellence in Theatre Education Award
 David Byrne and Vanessa Carlton – presented Best Original Score
 Kelli O'Hara – introduced Kiss Me, Kate
 Sutton Foster and Andrew Rannells – presented Best Revival of a Musical
 Karen Olivo, Aaron Tveit, and Danny Burstein – presenters of the Creative Arts winners
 Regina King and Laura Linney – presented Best Actor in a Play
 Judith Light – presented Best Play
 Brian Stokes Mitchell – presenter of the In Memoriam tribute
 Ben Platt – presented Best Actor in a Musical
 Audra McDonald – presented Best Actress in a Musical
 Sara Bareilles and Josh Groban – presented Best Musical

Performances
The following shows and performers performed on the ceremony's telecast:

"We Do It Live" – James Corden
"Ain't Too Proud to Beg" / "Just My Imagination (Running Away with Me)" / "I Can't Get Next to You" – Ain't Too Proud
"Unstoppable" – Tootsie
"I Cain't Say No" / "Oklahoma" – Oklahoma!
"Day-O (The Banana Boat Song)" / "The Whole Being Dead Thing" – Beetlejuice
"Tonight Belongs to You" / "It's Time to Dance" – The Prom
"James in the Bathroom" – James Corden, Sara Bareilles, and Josh Groban, cameo by Neil Patrick Harris
"Rockin' Jerusalem" – Choir Boy
"Road to Hell" / "Wait For Me" – Hadestown
"Too Darn Hot" – Kiss Me, Kate
"Believe" – The Cher Show
"Can You Feel the Love Tonight" – Cynthia Erivo

The playwrights of the nominated plays spoke of their work. As noted by The Hollywood Reporter "Presenting the play nominees has always been the telecast's biggest challenge, and having the writers themselves take the stage to discuss the genesis and themes of their work felt particularly appropriate in such an uncommonly strong season for new plays. It helped that they were so entertaining." The playwrights included James Graham (Ink), Jez Butterworth (The Ferryman), Tarell Alvin McCraney (Choir Boy), Taylor Mac (Gary: A Sequel to Titus Andronicus) and Heidi Schreck (What the Constitution Means to Me).

Broadway Karaoke
During the broadcast's commercial breaks, Corden started Broadway Karaoke, whereby Broadway performers in the audience would karaoke a show tune without preplanning or rehearsal. Equipped with a songbook, microphone, and with a pianist to accompany, Corden would pick various stars to sing during three of the telecast commercials. Although the performances weren't broadcast, audience members and Corden's own film crew recorded the proceedings with some videos being posted online. Corden, whose own late-night show has a successful and similar ongoing segment, Carpool Karaoke, which led to television's Carpool Karaoke: The Series, revealed the scheme on his show the following night of the Tonys.

The first of three karaokes was Dear Evan Hansens Ben Platt who sang "Tomorrow" from Annie. During the next karaoke break was a performance of "96,000" from In the Heights by the upcoming film's Anthony Ramos who plays Usnavi, who was soon duetting with Christopher Jackson, who originated the role of Benny. The third performance was a "showstopper" shared by Corden on his show the next night, weaving online videos as well as from his own crew. Toward the end of the show he approached Pose's Billy Porter, who garnered media attention for his red and pink haute couture gown upcycled from [[Kinky Boots (musical)|Kinky Boots''']] curtains, to deliver what Corden said was an incredible performance of "Everything's Coming up Roses" from Gypsy, which received a standing ovation from the roughly 6,000 attendees.

Non-competitive awards
The non-competitive Special Tony Award was presented to Rosemary Harris, Terrence McNally and Harold Wheeler for Lifetime Achievement in the Theatre.

The Isabelle Stevenson Award was awarded to Judith Light for her work to end HIV/AIDS and support for LGBTQ+ and human rights.

The Excellence In Theatre Education Award recipient was Madeleine Michel of Monticello High School in Charlottesville, Virginia.

The Regional Theatre Tony Award winner was TheatreWorks (Silicon Valley), Palo Alto, California.

The Tony Honors for Excellence in Theatre was awarded to Broadway Inspirational Voices; Peter Entin, retired vice president of Theatre Operations for the Shubert Organization; Joseph Blakely Forbes, founder and president of Scenic Art Studios, Inc.; and FDNY Engine 54, Ladder 4, Battalion 9 (firehouse, New York City).

Special Tony Awards were presented to the late Marin Mazzie, music director Jason Michael Webb, and Sonny Tilders and Creature Technology Company, creator of the gorilla in King Kong among others.

 Winners and nominees 

‡ The award is presented to the producer(s) of the musical or play.

Nominations and awards per production

Individuals with multiple nominations and awards

Reception
The show received a mixed reception from many media publications. On Metacritic, the ceremony has a weighted average score of 46 out of 100, based 6 reviews, indicating "mixed or average reviews". The Hollywood Reporter columnist David Rooney remarked, "The host started strong and had one sharp musical interlude mid-show, but elsewhere delivered strained comedy bits that felt familiar, safe and thematically generic." The New York Times theatre critic Mike Hale commented, "But after his verbal dexterity enlivened an overcrowded and bland opening number that did little to showcase the season's musicals, the material continually failed him, whether it was a tortured audience-participation gag about putting on a loser's face for the cameras, or a tortured audience-participation gag about generating some rap-style beefs between Broadway stars." Daniel D'Addario from Variety wrote, "The quality of showmanship — the simple sense of taking joy in a production having been brought across well — seemed painfully absent from a broadcast that has little other reason to exist. Many, many people who watch the Tonys never have seen and never will see a nominated show in Manhattan; for that audience, a production brought off well before the cameras is the ceremony's point vastly more than is a list of winners."

In addition, Caroline Siede from The A.V. Club gave the show a B−, expanding in her review, "All in all, this was a mostly satisfying, if not completely exhilarating year for the Tonys. I'll remember the winners and I'll remember some of the musical performances, but I doubt I'll remember James Corden's opening number in the way I still do with Neil Patrick Harris' "Bigger" or last year's Sara Bareilles and Josh Groban's tribute to losers." New York Post critic Michael Riedel wrote, "As for Corden, this was not his finest hour. The opening number, written especially for the telecast, was a dud, and he seemed a bit tired throughout the evening. There was a skit where he had Broadway actors dissing each other, and I can only hope he did not have script approval on that one." Theatre critic Charles McNulty of the Los Angeles Times remarked, "James Corden sprinkled in crowd-pleasing pokes at annoying audience members' phones ringing during shows, how expensive Broadway tickets have become and how low the industry's paychecks and the CBS telecast's ratings tend to be."

 Be More Chill parody 
Of the ten nominated musicals, Be More Chill was the only one to not have a performance or segment on the telecast. Host Corden, with Josh Groban and Sara Bareilles, performed a parody of  "Michael in the Bathroom", a song from the show. Joe Iconis, the show's composer and sole Tony nominee, praised the parody for giving the show exposure on a large scale, but the award ceremony was nevertheless criticized by fans for not crediting the source material. New York Posts Riedel noted Broadway League chief Charlotte St. Martin talked about the importance of getting young people to the theater, while the ceremony almost entirely ignored a show about teenagers whose target audience was mostly teenagers. The day after the ceremony, both Corden and Groban credited the show. St. Martin said, "We are doing everything we can to rectify [the situation]." CBS's Facebook post of the number was later revised to credit Iconis and Be More Chill as the parody's source.

Ratings
The ceremony averaged a Nielsen 4.3 ratings/8 share, and was watched by 5.4 million viewers. The ratings was a 10 percent decrease from previous ceremony's viewership of 6.3 million, becoming the lowest in its entire history.

In Memoriam
Broadway actor Cynthia Erivo performed "Can You Feel the Love Tonight" from The Lion King'' as images of theatre personalities who died in the past year were shown in the following order.

Marin Mazzie
Carol Channing
Alan Wasser
Philip Bosco
William Craver
Merle Debuskey
Georgia Engel
Ralph Koltai
Alvin Epstein
Maria Irene Fornes
Kaye Ballard
Jerry Frankel
William Goldman
Barbara Harris
Robert Kamlot
Terry Allen Kramer
Gary Beach
Jo Sullivan Loesser
Gillian Lynne
Eric LaJuan Summers
Galt MacDermot
Joe Masteroff
Vivian Matalon
Harvey Sabinson
Mark Medoff
Shirley Prendergast
Roger Hirson
Carol Hall
Donald Moffat
Liliane Montevecchi
Brian Murray
Winston Ntshona
Roger Robinson
Ntozake Shange
Carole Shelley
Craig Zadan
Glen Roven
Charlotte Rae
Albert Finney
Neil Simon

See also
 Drama Desk Awards
 2019 Laurence Olivier Awards – equivalent awards for West End theatre productions
 Obie Award
 New York Drama Critics' Circle
 Theatre World Award
 Lucille Lortel Awards

References

External links
 

2019 awards in the United States
2019 in New York City
2010s in Manhattan
2019 theatre awards
June 2019 events in the United States
Tony Awards ceremonies
Television shows directed by Glenn Weiss